Drama is a form of fiction represented in performance in a theatre or on radio or television.

Drama may also refer to:

Subgenres of drama
 Drama (film and television), a genre of film and television series with an intent for a serious tone
 Comedy drama, a genre made of a combination of comedy and drama
 Docudrama, a genre of film and television that involves dramatized re-enactments of events
 Legal drama, a genre of film and television
 Melodrama, a variant of drama that involves exaggeration of plot and characters to evoke strong emotions
 Political drama, a variant of drama that involves political components

Music

Performers and labels
 Drama (American band), a dance/R&B duo
 Drama (British band), a rock band
 Drama (Norwegian band), a 1980s boy band
 Drama (rapper) (born 1981), American rapper
 DJ Drama (born 1978), American DJ
 Drama Records, a Puerto Rican record label

Albums 
 Drama (Bananarama album), 2006
 Drama (Bitter:Sweet album) or the title song, 2008
 Drama (Carolin Fortenbacher album), 2008
 Drama (Jamelia album), 2000
 Drama (Jang Minho album) or the title song, 2017
 Drama (Montt Mardié album), 2005
 Drama (Yes album), 1980
 Drama (Aaron Yan EP), 2014
 Drama (Nine Muses EP) or the title song, 2015
 Drama, by Flaw, 2000
 Drama, by Shindy, 2019

Songs
 "Drama" (song), by Kate Miller-Heidke, 2014
 "Drama!", by Erasure, 1989
 "Drama", by AJR from The Click, 2017
 "Drama", by Dave from Psychodrama, 2019
 "Drama", by DJ Kay Slay from The Streetsweeper, Vol. 2, 2004
 "Drama", by Erykah Badu from Baduizm, 1997
 "Drama", by Ivy Queen from Diva, 2003
 "Drama", by Pink Sweats, 2018

Film and television
 Drama (2010 film), a Chilean film
 Drama (2012 film), an Indian film directed by Yogaraj Bhat
 Drama (2018 film), an Indian film directed by Ranjith
 Drama (British TV channel), a UKTV network free-to-air television channel
 Drama (MENA TV channel), a Pan-Arab television channel
 Alibi (TV channel), formerly UK Drama, a pay television channel
 Syrian Drama TV, a government-owned television station
 Drama (British TV series), a 1977 anthology series
 Drama (Spanish TV series), a 2020 streaming series
 Johnny "Drama" Chase, a character in the HBO television series Entourage

Places
 Drama (regional unit), Greece
 Drama, Greece, the capital city
 Drama, Šentjernej, a village in Slovenia
 Drama, a village in Yambol Province, Bulgaria

Other uses
 Drama (graphic novel), a 2012 graphic novel by Raina Telgemeier
 Icona drama, a species of comb-footed spider in the family Theridiidae
 The Drama, two defunct American arts magazines

See also
 Dramatic (disambiguation)